The 1953 Michigan Wolverines football team represented the University of Michigan in the 1953 Big Ten Conference football season. In its sixth year under head coach Bennie Oosterbaan, Michigan compiled a 6–3 record (3–3 against conference opponents), tied for fifth place in the Big Ten, outscored opponents by a combined total of 163 to 101, and was ranked No. 20 in the final AP Poll and No. 19 in the Coaches Polls.

Center Dick O'Shaughnessy was the team captain, and right halfback Tony Branoff received the team's most valuable player award. Two Michigan players received All-Big Ten honors: left end Bob Topp was selected by the Associated Press as a first-team player, and left halfback Ted Kress.

The team's statistical leaders included quarterback Duncan McDonald with 293 passing yards, Tony Branoff with 501 rushing yards, and Bob Topp with 331 receiving yards.

Schedule

Statistical leaders
Michigan's individual statistical leaders for the 1953 season include those listed below.

Rushing

Passing

Receiving

Kickoff returns

Punt returns

Personnel

Letter winners

The following 31 players received varsity letters for their participation on the 1953 team. Players who started at least four games are shown with their names in bold.

 Fred Baer, 5'11", 180 pounds, junior, LaGrange, IL - fullback
Lou Baldacci, 6'0", 205 pounds, sophomore, Akron, OH - started 9 games at quarterback
James T. Balog, 6'3", 210 pounds, senior, Wheaton, IL - started 9 games at left tackle
Richard E. Balzhiser, 6'0", 186 pounds, senior, Wheaton, IL - started 9 games at fullback
Richard A. Beison, 6'0", 200 pounds, senior, East Chicago, IN - started 9 games at right guard
 Donald C. Bennett, 6'2", 195 pounds, senior, Chicago - tackle
Tony Branoff, 5'11", 180 pounds, sophomore, Flint, MI - started 9 games at right halfback
 Theodore J. Cachey, 5'11", 185 pounds, senior, Chicago - guard
 J. Daniel Cline, 5'10", 168 pounds, junior, Brockport, NY - halfback
Donald Dugger, 5'10", 185 pounds, senior, Charleston, WV - started 9 games at left end
 George S. Dutter, 6'2", 190 pounds, senior, Fort Wayne, IN - end
 James W. Fox, 6'0", 185 pounds, sophomore, Saginaw, MI - guard
 H. Ronald Geyer, 6'2", 220 pounds, junior, Toledo, OH - tackle
 Edward L. Hickey, 5'8", 160 pounds, senior, Anaconda, MT - halfback
 Robert S. Hurley, 5'10", 180 pounds, senior, Alamosa, CO- fullback
 Raymond K. Kenaga, 5'11", 170 pounds, junior, Sterling, IL - quarterback
Eugene P. Knutson, 6'4", 210 pounds, senior, Beloit, WI - started 8 games at right end
 William P. Kolesar, 6'0", 190 pounds, sophomore, Mentor, OH - tackle
Ted Kress, 5'11", 175 pounds, senior, Kansas City, MO - started 9 games at left halfback
 Duncan B. McDonald, 6'0", 175 pounds, junior, Flint, MI - quarterback
 G. Edgar Meads, 6'0", 190 pounds, sophomore, Oxford, MI - guard
John M. Morrow, 6'2", 220 pounds, sophomore, Ann Arbor, MI - started 4 games at center
Dick O'Shaughnessy, 5'11", 190 pounds, senior, Seaford, NY - started 5 games at center
 H. John Peckham Jr., 6'2", 220 pounds, sophomore, Sioux Falls, SD - center
 Thad C. Stanford, 6'0", 175 pounds, senior, Midland, MI - end
Dick Strozewski, 6'0", 205 pounds, senior, South Bend, IN - started 9 games at left tackle
Bob Topp, 6'2", 190 pounds, senior, Kalamazoo, MI - started 8 games at left end, 1 game at right end
 John J. Veselenak, 6'2", 190 pounds, junior, Flint, MI - end
 Art Walker, 5'11" 200 pounds, junior, South Haven, MI - tackle
 Gerald H. Williams, 6'2", 188 pounds, sophomore, Flint, MI - started 1 game at left end
 Ronald M. Williams, 5'9", 185 pounds, senior, Massillon, OH - guard

Coaches and staff
Michigan's 1953 coaching, training, and support staff included the following persons.

Head coach: Bennie Oosterbaan
Assistant coaches: 
 Jack Blott - line coach
 Cliff Keen - assistant football coach, head wrestling coach
 Bill Orwig - offensive backfield coach
 Matt Patanelli - defensive ends coach
 Don Robinson - defensive backfield coach
 Wally Weber - freshman coach
 J. T. White - assistant line coach, scout, and junior varsity coach
Trainer: Jim Hunt
Manager: Richard Petrie

Awards and honors

Honors and awards for the 1953 season went to the following individuals.
Captain: Dick O'Shaughnessy
All-Conference: Ted Kress, Bob Topp
Most Valuable Player: Tony Branoff
Meyer Morton Award: Tony Branoff

References

Michigan
Michigan Wolverines football seasons
Michigan Wolverines football